Hinsonton is an unincorporated community located in Mitchell County, Georgia, United States.

Geography
Hinsonton's latitude is at 31.18 and its longitude is at -84.029. Its elevation rests at 338 feet. Hinsonton appears on the Cotton U.S. Geological Survey Map.

Churches
Hinsonton Baptist Church rests in the area.

References 

Unincorporated communities in Mitchell County, Georgia
Unincorporated communities in Georgia (U.S. state)